Ubiquitin/ISG15-conjugating enzyme E2 L6 is a protein that in humans is encoded by the UBE2L6 gene.

The modification of proteins with ubiquitin is an important cellular mechanism for targeting abnormal or short-lived proteins for degradation. Ubiquitination involves at least three classes of enzymes: ubiquitin-activating enzymes (E1S), ubiquitin-conjugating enzymes (E2S) and ubiquitin-protein ligases (E3s). This gene encodes a member of the E2 ubiquitin-conjugating enzyme family.

This enzyme is highly similar in primary structure to the enzyme encoded by UBE2L3 gene. Two alternatively spliced transcript variants encoding distinct isoforms have been found for this gene.

References

Further reading